Ana Veronica Rodean (born 23 June 1984) is a Romanian race walker. She competed in the women's 20 kilometres walk event at the 2016 Summer Olympics. In 2018, she competed in the women's 20 kilometres walk event at the 2018 European Athletics Championships held in Berlin, Germany. She finished in 19th place.

References

External links
 
 
 
 

1984 births
Living people
Romanian female racewalkers
Place of birth missing (living people)
Athletes (track and field) at the 2016 Summer Olympics
Olympic athletes of Romania
20th-century Romanian women
21st-century Romanian women